The 2008 Rhode Island Rams football team was an American football team that represented the University of Rhode Island in the Colonial Athletic Association (CAA) during the 2008 NCAA Division I FCS football season. In their first and only season under head coach Darren Rizzi, the Rams compiled a 3–9 record (1–7 against conference opponents) and tied for last place in the North Division of the CAA's North Division.

Schedule

References

Rhode Island
Rhode Island Rams football seasons
Rhode Island Rams football